F.W. Anderson may refer to:

 Frederick William Anderson (politician) (1883–1955), civil engineer, rancher and political figure in British Columbia
 Frederick William Anderson (geologist) (1905–1982), British geologist and palaeontologist
 Fred W. Anderson, Democrat member of Illinois House of Representatives in 1957